Alf, Bill and Fred is a 1964 short animated film directed by Bob Godfrey and written by Stan Hayward.

Summary
The plot and the moral are both very simple. The three titular multi-species characters are friends who like to bounce a lot. Bill - the man - suddenly inherits a lot of money and starts spending it with reckless abandon (on, amongst other things, a tin of peaches). He abandons his old friends and becomes increasingly hedonistic. Meanwhile, the dog and the duck continue bouncing. Eventually, Bill accidentally bounces out of a window in a very tall building. He loses his memory and goes back to his old friends. They set up a business together selling happiness to people.

The moral of the story is stated to be: "It is easier to sell happiness than to buy it because most people are sillier than you are!".

See also
1964 in film
Independent animation

References

External links
 
 
  The Sunday Intertitle: Gooney Tunes

1960s animated short films
1964 films
Films directed by Bob Godfrey
1964 animated films
British animated short films
Animated films about dogs
Animated films about birds
Collage film
1960s British films